Krab is a surname. Notable people with the surname include:

Jørn Krab (born 1945), Danish rower
Preben Krab (born 1952), Danish rower, brother of Jørn

Danish-language surnames